Valles Mines is an unincorporated community in southern Jefferson County, Missouri, United States. It is located approximately seven miles south of De Soto. It is located on Missouri Route V less than one mile west of U.S. Route 67. Joachim Creek flows past the north side of the community.  The ZIP Code for Valles Mines is 63087.

A post office called Valles Mines was established in 1826. The community is named after François Vallé, who established lead mines there in the 18th century.

References

Unincorporated communities in Jefferson County, Missouri
French colonial settlements of Upper Louisiana
Unincorporated communities in Missouri